Naganuma Station (長沼駅) is the name of two train stations located in Japan:

 Naganuma Station (Shizuoka)
 Naganuma Station (Tokyo)